Verónica Homs is a Spanish model and presenter.

Biography 

She was born on 5 May in Tenerife (Canary Islands, Spain) in the year.

In the year 2001, Verónica was elected Miss Tenerife and then she won the title of Miss Interviú. Verónica was cover twice for the Spanish famous magazine. She played for that magazine the calendar 2002 and later to other five girls that were Miss Interviú the calendar of the year 2004.

Later on, she collaborated during four years in the program El Expreso in the Televisión Canaria Channel.

For love, she left to live to Perú and her she found work there.

She worked as reporter until February 2011 in the TV program: Enemigos Públicos.

In October 2011, she stopped to work in the program Lima Limón. According to his words she preferred to be a reporter that presenter. Only, some days later she began to work in a new program: La Noche es Mía.

In December 2011, she was cover of the magazine Soho.

In April 2012, she was signed by the channel Panamericana Televisión. She presented during the noon the program: 24 Horas and in Saturdays she collaborated in the television News: El Panamericano.
 In those two programs, she was only six months for blame that that TV channel had economic problems.

Family life 

On 15 March 2012 she married Argentinian manager Christian Fernández.

On 23 April 2014 their first daughter, Ainhoa, was born.

References

External links 
 

People from Tenerife
Living people
Spanish television presenters
Spanish women television presenters
Year of birth missing (living people)